Eliécer Espinosa Calvo (born 12 March 1996) is a Colombian footballer who currently plays as a forward for Liga Nacional club Mixco.

Career
Having begun his career in his native Colombia with Envigado and Leones, Espinosa moved to Finland in 2018 to join Ykkönen club Klubi 04, scoring two goals in the final four matches of the 2018 season. This form earned him a move to TPS. On 4 February 2022 he moved to FC Lahti, departing the club just eighteen days later having only made one appearance, returning to TPS.

At the start of 2022, Espinosa departed Finland, moving to Venezuela to join Carabobo on a contract until the end of 2023. He moved to Venezuelan Primera División rivals Deportivo Lara in June 2022. In November 2022, Espinosa signed for Liga Nacional club Deportivo Mixco.

Career statistics

Club

Notes

References

1997 births
Living people
Sportspeople from Chocó Department
Colombian footballers
Colombian expatriate footballers
Association football forwards
Envigado F.C. players
Leones F.C. footballers
Klubi 04 players
Turun Palloseura footballers
FC Lahti players
Carabobo F.C. players
Asociación Civil Deportivo Lara players
Categoría Primera A players
Categoría Primera B players
Veikkausliiga players
Ykkönen players
Venezuelan Primera División players
Colombian expatriate sportspeople in Finland
Expatriate footballers in Finland
Colombian expatriate sportspeople in Venezuela
Expatriate footballers in Venezuela
Colombian expatriate sportspeople in Guatemala
Expatriate footballers in Guatemala